Platysomus (from  , 'broad' and   'body') is an extinct genus of ray-finned fish that lived in the Carboniferous and Permian periods. Fossils have been found worldwide.

Its jaws were placed vertically under the braincase, giving it a wide gape. Platysomus is thought to have fed on plankton, and lived in both fresh and salt water.

References

Palaeonisciformes
Prehistoric ray-finned fish genera
Carboniferous bony fish
Permian bony fish
Paleozoic fish of Europe
Paleozoic fish of North America
Taxa named by Louis Agassiz